Sea of Silver Light is a science fiction novel by American writer Tad Williams, the fourth and final book in his Otherland series.  It was published in 2001 with a paperback release in 2002.

It concludes the saga begun in City of Golden Shadow, taking the characters through a world being born around them as they face off against Dread and the being known as the Other.

References

2001 American novels
2001 science fiction novels
American science fiction novels
Novels by Tad Williams
DAW Books books
Books with cover art by Michael Whelan